August Man is a men's luxury lifestyle publication, based in Singapore, which launched in September 2006. The magazine's fields of focus include fashion, design, travel, art, architecture, food, sports, health, business, books, music, film, motoring and watches. Actors Ken Watanabe, Francis Ng and Daniel Dae Kim, Japanese soccer star Hidetoshi Nakata, and chef/author/TV presenter Anthony Bourdain featured on August Mans cover. The magazine also has franchises in Malaysia and Indonesia.

August Man is published by Burda Singapore Pte Ltd, a subsidiary of German media conglomerate Hubert Burda Media.

External links

2006 establishments in Singapore
Magazines established in 2006
Men's magazines published in Singapore
Monthly magazines published in Singapore